Jean Val Jean  (born Emmanuel Delcour, June 19, 1980, Montluçon, Allier) is an actor and model currently working as a personal trainer and professional chef. Delcour has made several relatively high-profile appearances on mainstream television, including Keeping Up with the Kardashians and Chopped. In November 2009 he appeared on Chef Academy, where he was described as being a graphic designer and having studied graphic design for five years in Bordeaux, France. Originally a France-based model, Delcour came to the U.S. to pursue a career in acting and cooking. He has made several appearances, including on The Last Ship, It's Always Sunny in Philadelphia, CSI: Las Vegas and Jane the Virgin. He's currently a professional private chef and personal trainer.

Since 2018, Delcour has been painting and creating art pieces, an extension of his previous background in graphic design.

Awards
 2007 AVN Award for Male Foreign Performer of the Year winner.

References

External links
  (as Emmanuel Delcoir)
 
 
 Official website

1980 births
Living people
People from Montluçon
French expatriate male actors in the United States
French chefs
French male pornographic film actors
People from Allier